Mattia Balardi (born 19 November 1991), known professionally as Mr. Rain, is an Italian rapper and record producer.

Biography 
Balardi was born in Desenzano del Garda. His music career began in 2011, when he released his debut mixtape Time 2 Eat.  In 2013, along with rapper Osso, he took part in the seventh season of the Italian talent X Factor Italia. They made it all the way to the Judges Houses stage, where they were eliminated. They were then chosen to compete in a final showdown for an extra spot in the live shows, but lost out to Roberta Pompa.

In January 2014 he embarked on his first tournées, performing in major Italian cities, while on 12 May 2015 he released his first album Memories, anticipated by the single "Tutto quello che ho".  The album consists of sixteen tracks, including "Carillon", certified double platinum by FIMI in 2018. On June 2, 2016, the single '"Supereroe"' was released, certified as a gold.

On January 5, 2018, the single Ipernova was released, which anticipated the second album Butterfly Effect, released on the January 26. On September 21 of the same year, the album was reissued under the title Butterfly Effect 2.0, containing four bonus tracks and was promoted by a nationwide tournée.

On May 17, 2019, the single "La somma" was released, made with Italian singer Martina Attili, being certified gold. On March 13, 2020, the single "Fiori di Chernobyl", from the album Petrichor, was released, reaching the position 2 on the Top Singles chart.

On 4 December 2022, it was officially announced Mr. Rain participation in the Sanremo Music Festival 2023. "Supereroi" was later announced as his entry for the Sanremo Music Festival 2023. He finished in 3rd place.

Discography

Studio albums

Mixtape albums

Singles

As lead artist

As featured artist

References 

Living people
1991 births
Italian rappers
Italian record producers
21st-century Italian male musicians
Musicians from Brescia